Arthur Coppin Straker (12 August 1893 – 14 October 1961) was an English cricketer. Straker's batting and bowling styles are unknown.  He was born at Hexham, Northumberland. He was educated at Harrow School and played in the 1909 and 1910 Eton v Harrow matches at Lord's as a lower-order batsman.

Straker made his only first-class appearance for Cambridge University against Northamptonshire in 1913.  In this match, he was dismissed for a duck by George Thompson in the university's first-innings, while in their second-innings he was dismissed for 21 runs by the same bowler.  Straker later made appeared for Denbighshire, making his debut for the Welsh county in the 1933 Minor Counties Championship against the Yorkshire Second XI.  He made a further four Minor Counties Championship appearances for the county, the last of which came against Cheshire in 1935.

He died in Pawston, Mindrum, Northumberland on 14 October 1961. At the time of his death he was described as a "racehorse owner and trainer".

References

External links
Arthur Straker at ESPNcricinfo
Arthur Straker at CricketArchive

1893 births
1961 deaths
Sportspeople from Hexham
Cricketers from Northumberland
People educated at Harrow School
Alumni of the University of Cambridge
English cricketers
Cambridge University cricketers
Denbighshire cricketers